Nicolas Granger-Taylor (born 1963) is a contemporary artist whose work primarily comprises portraits, female nudes, and still lifes, painted in oil on canvas. His work has been exhibited at the Royal Academy, London, and the Metropolitan Museum of Art, New York.

Education
Nicolas Granger-Taylor was educated at Latymer Upper School, Hammersmith. He began his art training at Kingston Polytechnic (1981–82), followed by a three-year degree course in Fine Art at Bristol Polytechnic (1982–85). He took a Postgraduate Diploma in Painting the Royal Academy Schools, London (1987–90).

Critical reception
Nicholas Usherwood in the RA Magazine wrote: "He is obsessed by light and power of light, as it reveals objects both animate and inanimate, to create a disturbing sense, in de Chirico's memorable phrase, 'of still lifes come alive or figures become still'." Mary Rose Beaumont wrote in the Art Review: "A fine draughtsman with a firm grasp of composition, Granger-Taylor combines sensuous handling of the paint with a sensitive feeling for his subject."

Solo exhibitions
1988   Cadogan Contemporary, London
1991   Waterman Fine Art, London
1993   Waterman Fine Art, London
1999   Offer Waterman & Co, London
2003   Offer Waterman & Co, London
2011   Jonathan Cooper, Park Walk Gallery, London
2013   Jonathan Cooper, Park Walk Gallery, London

Group exhibitions
1986   The South Bank Picture Show, Royal Festival Hall, London
1987   John Player Portrait Award, National Portrait Gallery, London
1987   Summer Exhibition, Royal Academy of Arts, London
1987   The South Bank Picture Show, Royal Festival Hall, London
1988   The South Bank Picture Show, Royal Festival Hall, London
1989   Summer Exhibition, Royal Academy of Arts, London
1990   B.P. Portrait Award, National Portrait Gallery, London
1991   The NatWest 90’s Prize for Art, NatWest Tower, London
1992   Summer Exhibition, Royal Academy of Arts, London
1992   The Discerning Eye, Mall Galleries, London
1995   B.P. Portrait Award, National Portrait Gallery, London
1995   Ten British Artists, Waterman Fine Art, London
1996   Small Interiors, Metropolitan Museum of Art, New York
1997   Modern British Art, Offer Waterman & Co, London
1998   Modern British Art, Offer Waterman & Co., London
2005   Christmas Show, Browse and Darby, London
2006   Summer Exhibition, Royal Academy of Arts, London

Awards
1987   John Player Portrait Award, Special Commendation
1990   Elizabeth Greenshields Foundation Award
1990   Richard Ford Award
1999   Elizabeth Greenshields Foundation Award

Bibliography
Nicholas Usherwood, “Preview”, RA Magazine, Number 33, Winter 1991, p. 19
Giles Auty, “Ample figures”, The Spectator, 9 November 1991, pp. 63–64
Mary Rose Beaumont, “Nicolas Granger-Taylor”, Arts Review, 15 November 1991, p. 580
Rory Snookes, “Nicolas Granger-Taylor”, Apollo, February 1992, p. 128
Felicity Owen, “Brushes with youthful talent”, Country Life, 4 February 1993, pp. 30–33
Mary Rose Beaumont, “Nicolas Granger-Taylor”, Art Review, May 1993, p. 86
Giles Auty, “Do I see lemons?” The Spectator, 15 May 1993, p. 46
Julian Halsby, “In Conversation”, The Artist, May 1993, pp. 10–12
Helen Gould, “Back to Life”, Artists and Illustrators, November 1997, pp. 30–33
Andrew Devonshire, Accidents of Fortune, Michael Russell Ltd, 2004, p. 115 & colour plate

References

External links
 Artist's website
 Self Portrait in the collection of the Metropolitan Museum of Art

English artists
Modern painters
1963 births
Living people